The Intermediate League World Series (ILWS) Southeast Region and Southwest Region are two of the five United States regions that currently send teams to the World Series in Livermore, California. The two regions were created in 2013, when the ILWS began (as a new Little League Baseball World Series)

Southeast Region and Southwest Region states

Southeast Region

 Georgia

Southwest Region

 (East)
 (West)

Region Champions
As of the 2022 Intermediate League World Series.

Southeast Region Champions

Southwest Region Champions

Results by State
As of the 2022 Intermediate League World Series.

See also
South Region in other Little League divisions
Little League – South 1957-2000
Little League – Southeast
Little League – Southwest
Junior League
Senior League
Big League

References

+
+South
Defunct baseball competitions in the United States
2013 establishments in the United States
Recurring sporting events established in 2013